Katharina Heinz (born 27 June 1987) is a German skeleton racer who has competed since 2003. 2006 she joined the German national squad. Heinz debuted in Skeleton World Cup in November 2010. Her best result in World Cup is 5th place in 2011–12 Skeleton World Cup. Heinz finished second at the European Skeleton Championship in 2012.

References

External links 
 
 
 
 

1987 births
German female skeleton racers
Living people
Sportspeople from Siegen
20th-century German women
21st-century German women